The following television stations broadcast on digital or analog channel 12 in Canada:

 CFCF-DT in Montreal, Quebec
 CFCN-TV-1 in Drumheller, Alberta
 CFRN-DT in Edmonton, Alberta
 CFRN-TV-3 in Whitecourt, Alberta
 CFRN-TV-4 in Ashmont, Alberta
 CFRN-TV-10 in Rocky Mountain House, Alberta
 CFTF-DT-3 in Cabano, Quebec
 CHAU-DT-9 in L'Anse-à-Valleau, Quebec
 CHEX-DT in Peterborough, Ontario
 CHNB-DT in Saint John, New Brunswick
 CHTG-TV in Goose Bay, Newfoundland and Labrador
 CIRE-TV in High Prairie, Alberta
 CISA-TV-3 in Coleman, Alberta
 CISA-TV-4 in Waterton Park, Alberta
 CIVA-DT in Val d'Or, Quebec
 CIVF-DT in Baie-Trinite, Quebec
 CJCH-TV-2 in Truro, Nova Scotia
 CJCH-TV-3 in Valley, Nova Scotia
 CKAM-TV in Upsalquitch, New Brunswick
 CKBQ-TV-1 in Nipawin, Saskatchewan
 CKCK-TV-1 in Colgate, Saskatchewan
 CKMC-TV in Swift Current, Saskatchewan
 CKTN-TV-4 in Creston, British Columbia
 CKTV-DT in Saguenay, Quebec
 CKVR-TV-1 in Parry Sound, Ontario
 CKYD-TV in Dauphin, Manitoba
 CKYP-TV in The Pas, Manitoba

12 TV stations in Canada